Associazione Calcio Robur Siena 1904, commonly referred to as Siena, is an Italian football club based in Siena, Tuscany. The club was re-incorporated in 2020 after the bankruptcy of the previous legal entity Robur Siena, which itself was the reincarnation of the original club Associazione Calcio Siena S.p.A.. A.C. Siena's predecessor was founded in 1904.

Siena plays its home games at the Stadio Artemio Franchi. The ground's capacity is 15,373 and is located in the centre of Siena.

History
Formed in 1904 as Società Studio e Divertimento (Society for Study and Entertainment), as a sports club characterised by a black and white striped jersey which was derived from the city of Siena coat of arms. It founded its football club, named Società Sportiva Robur in 1908. Today, the name "Robur" is widely used by the local supporters to distinguish itself from the two basketball teams, "Mens Sana" and "".

The team finally became known as Associazione Calcio Siena (A.C. Siena) in 1933–34. In 1934–35, Siena were promoted for the first time to Serie B. In the post-war 1945–46 season, Siena played in the top division of Italian football for the first time. During that season, a mixed wartime league was composed of both Serie A and Serie B teams. Some of the southern sides that took part in the top division, including Siena, were Serie B teams, while northern Serie B teams played at the second level with the Serie C teams. Therefore, although Siena played in the top division, it was not considered as having officially played in Serie A during that season and not having qualified for the National Round. Siena won the fourth tier league championship in 1955–56 as the Scudetto IV Serie.

After having spent 55 years playing in several lower divisions, Siena were promoted back to Serie B for the start of the 2000–01 season. Following a good first up season in Serie B, the following season saw Siena in serious trouble and coach Giuseppe Papadopulo was sacked, although he would later be recalled and was able to save the club from relegation on the season's final matchday.

The following season, again with Papadopulo as head coach, Siena were promoted to Serie A for the first time officially, led by players such as Rodrigo Taddei and Pinga. Their return marked 58 years since their last appearance in the top division of Italian football.

In the 2003–04 campaign, the first Serie A season in the club's history, Siena finished in a respectable 13th place.

In the 2004–05 Serie A campaign, with Luigi De Canio as head coach, Siena struggled for long periods of the season, languishing in the relegation zone for a great part of the campaign, and with the team drawing far too many games and barely recording any wins, they looked almost certain to be relegated. However, a resurgence of form towards of the end of the season gave them hope, and a 2–1 win against already relegated Atalanta on the last day saw them secure safety and an acceptable 14th place in the table.

The 2005–06 season also saw Siena fighting hard and it successfully kept its place in Serie A. They ended the season in 17th place. For the 2006–07 season, Mario Beretta, who led Parma during the previous season, was appointed as new head coach. He kept Siena in Serie A after a 2–1 home win against Lazio in the final matchday.

During the 2006–07 season, club chairman Paolo De Luca, who took over in 2001 and helped the club to their first historical Serie A promotion, started talks to sell the club to a conglomerate of Tuscan businessmen led by Giovanni Lombardi Stronati, chairman of Valle del Giovenco. The bid was finalised on 30 March 2007, one day before De Luca died after a long illness.

The head coach for the 2007–08 campaign was expected to be Andrea Mandorlini, but he left the club by mutual consent on 12 November. Former coach Mario Beretta once again took charge.

The club also explored the possibility of changing its denomination to include the name of their main sponsor, Banca Monte dei Paschi di Siena. On 9 July 2007, the club announced it had changed their denomination to "A.C. Siena Montepaschi". However, the name change needed to be accepted by the Italian Football Federation (FIGC) to become official: After the refusal by FIGC, this idea was abandoned.

The club was then acquired by Massimo Mezzaroma, with Valentina Mezzaroma as vice-chairman. On 7 May 2011, Siena were once again promoted to Serie A after finishing second in the 2010–11 Serie B. The club's stint into the top flight lasted two seasons, as they were relegated after ending the 2012–13 Serie A in 19th place.

Siena failed to register for 2014–15 Serie B on 15 July 2014, later announcing their bankruptcy. Former A.C. Siena chairman Massimo Mezzaroma was also sued by the prosecutor for false accounting in player swap (Rossi–Galuppo) Eventually the club and Mezzaroma were inadmissible from the charge due to expiry of the legal proceeding. Nevertheless, Guardia di Finanza seized €8.5 million from Mezzaroma for charges related to the bankruptcy.

In July 2014, thanks to the article 52 of N.O.I.F., the club was refounded under new legal person società sportiva dilettantistica Robur Siena, restarting from 2014–15 Serie D. It was promoted to 2015–16 Lega Pro as champions of Group E in June 2015.

In the 2015–16 season, Robur won the regional derby against Pisa at the Garibaldi Arena after 57 years and qualified for semifinal of Coppa Italia Lega Pro against Foggia, winning the first leg at home, 5–2.

Due to the non-admission of Avellino, Bari and Cesena, Siena became one of the repechage candidates to 2018–19 Serie B on 1 August 2018. Siena finished as the runner-up in the 2017–18 Serie C promotion playoffs, as well as runner-up in the group stage, losing to Cosenza and Livorno respectively. However, after a lengthy legal battles, Serie B decided to leave the 3 spots vacate.

Siena failed to register to Serie C after the end of the 2019–20 season, and the club was successively refounded as ACN Siena 1904 under the ownership of an Armenian group owning Armenian Premier League football club FC Noah. The club was then readmitted to Serie C in 2021 to fill a vacancy, and then sold to Italian group Global Service in June 2022. The club was subsequently renamed to Associazione Calcio Robur Siena 1904.

Colours and badge
The team's home colours are black and white.

Anthem

The official anthem is Franco Baldi's Su Forza Siena. Other historic city anthems such as the Canto della Verbena and the Marcia del Palio are often sung by local fans during the matches.

Players

First team squad

Out on loan

Notable former players

Management

Management and coaching staff

Honours
 Serie B
 Winners: 2002–03
 Serie C1
 Winners: 1937–38, 1999–00
 Serie C2
 Winners:  1981–82, 1984–85,  1989–90
 Scudetto IV Serie/Serie D:
 Winners: 1955–56, 2014–15
 Supercoppa di Serie C
 Winners: 2000

Managers

References

External links

   
 Siena statistics

 
Football clubs in Tuscany
Association football clubs established in 1904
Serie A clubs
Serie B clubs
Serie C clubs
Serie D clubs
1904 establishments in Italy
Companies based in Siena
Sport in Siena
Phoenix clubs (association football)
2014 establishments in Italy
2020 establishments in Italy